Jörg Stohler (born 27 August 1949) is a Swiss former international footballer who played as a defender during the 1970s and 1980s. He played over 300 League Championship matches and won the Swiss League Championship four times. He also won the Swiss Cup, the Swiss League Cup and Coppa delle Alpi once. Stohler played ten games for the Swiss national team.

Football career 
Born in Pratteln, Stohler started his football in the youth system with local club Pratteln and as of 1967 played regularly for their first team. He moved to FC Basel in 1970.

Stohler was part of the team that completed a record run of 52 home games unbeaten in the St. Jakob Stadium between June 1968 and August 1972. On 30 July 1974 he scored the first goal in the Coppa delle Alpi Final, but Basel lost by 1–2 against Young Boys. He also scored a penalty in the Final of the same competition on 29 September 1981 as Basel won 5-3 on penalties after a 2-2 at full-time. In the Wankdorf Stadion in Bern on 11 June 1983 Stohler played his 300th league match.

At the end of his professional career, in the summer of 1984, Stohler moved to FC Grenchen and he played there for two years. Then for the season 1988/89 Stohler moved to FC Münchenstein in the 3. Liga (then the sixth tier of the Swiss Football League) and became their player-manager. This was a very successful move because at the end of the season the club was promoted to the 2. Liga.

During his time at FC Basel, Stohler played ten games for the Swiss national team between 1975 and 1980.

Private life 
Stohler did his apprenticeship as a construction mechanic. He worked in the local chemical industry, but since 2005 he is retired. Stohler is married and has two grown up children.

Honours 
Basel
 Swiss League championship winner: 1972, 1973, 1977, 1981
 Swiss Cup winner: 1975
 Swiss League Cup winner: 1973
 Alpencupsieger: 1981

Grenchen
 Promotion from the Nationalliga B to the Nationalliga A: 1985

Münchenstein
 Promotion to the 2. Liga: 1989

References

1949 births
FC Basel players
FC Grenchen players
Swiss men's footballers
Switzerland international footballers
Living people
Association football defenders